is a Japanese seinen manga series written and illustrated by Hiromi Morishita. It describes the daily life of Ashibe (an elementary school boy) and his family and friends, including a white sea lion pet named Goma-chan.

It was published from 1988 to 1994 in the magazine Weekly Young Jump, owned by Shueisha, with a total of 8 volumes. It received an OVA in January 1991, which led to an animated television adaptation in the same year, aired on TBS from April to December 1991. It was followed by another season named Shōnen Ashibe 2 from 1992 to 1993.

In the same magazine, a sequel of the manga, named ComaGoma, which depicted Ashibe as a 2nd grade student, was serialized from 2000 to 2004, with 6 volumes. In April 2016, 22 years after the original run ended, it began serializing in Futabasha's magazine Monthly Action a continuation of the original manga, named Shōnen Ashibe: GO! GO! Goma-chan, illustrated by Ogino Junko, which was published from April 2016 to March 2017, with 8 volumes. It had a 32-episode animated television adaptation from 2016 to 2017 in NHK Educational TV. Several seasons have been broadcast since then: Shōnen Ashibe: GO! GO! Goma-chan 2 from April 2017 to February 2018 with 32 episodes, Shōnen Ashibe: GO! GO! Goma-chan 3 from April 2018 to February 2019 with 32 episodes and Shōnen Ashibe: GO! GO! Goma-chan 4 from April to December 2019 with 24 episodes.

In July 2017, it was first published in Monthly Action the continuation of the ComaGoma manga, named ComaGoma Goma-chan, and ended in July 2018 with 6 volumes. Another sequel of the manga, named Seishōnen Ashibe began serializing also in Monthly Action in the same month. It depicts an older Ashibe, who has become a freshman in high school, with Shohei in charge of the illustration.

And in February 2020, another sequel named 3rd Grade Ashibe QQ Goma-chan began its serialization in Futabasha's magazine Manga Action, and it depicts Ashibe as a 3rd grade student.

Reception 
When the anime was aired, the manga gained an explosive popularity, and by 2016, the original 1988 run had sold 20 million copies.

References

External links
  
  

1988 manga
1991 anime television series debuts
1992 anime television series debuts
2001 manga
2016 manga
2016 anime television series debuts
2017 manga
2017 anime television series debuts
2018 manga
2018 anime television series debuts
2019 anime television series debuts
2020 manga
Seinen manga
Shueisha manga
Anime series based on manga
Comedy anime and manga
Futabasha manga
Shin-Ei Animation
Slice of life anime and manga
NHK original programming